There have been several seeds known at different times as the oldest viable seed.

Dormancy allows seeds to survive for extended periods, which can aid in seed dispersal and spread out the growth and establishment of seedlings, increasing the likelihood that some of the next generations survive if conditions are not suitable for seedling establishment. Over time,  seeds lose viability which is the ability to initiate metabolic activity, cellular growth, and germination.  Seeds have many cells and tissues that die over time, and these deaths can be delayed or increased by environmental conditions the seed experiences. Very generally, small seeds, especially from weedy species and annuals are more likely to remain viable in the soil longer than larger perennial seeds. The seeds of some aquatic plants also may remain viable longer in mud because their viability is aided by the aquatic environment which remains cool and moist.

Carbon-dated
The oldest  seed that has grown into a viable plant was a Judean date palm seed about 2,000 years old, recovered from excavations at Herod the Great's palace on Masada in Israel. It had been preserved in a cool, dry place, not by freezing. It was germinated in 2005. (For more details refer to Judean date palm: Germination of 2000-year-old seed).
The second oldest viable seed recorded is the carbon-14-dated 1,300-year-old sacred lotus (Nelumbo nucifera), recovered from a dry lake bed in northeastern China in 1995.

Anecdotal
In December, 2009, a Turkish newspaper reported a claim that a 4,000-year-old lentil had been successfully germinated.
In 1954 Arctic lupine seeds (Lupinus arcticus) were found in the Yukon Territory in glacial sediments believed to be at least 10,000 years old. Seeds were germinated in 1966. Later, new dating techniques revealed that they were likely modern seeds (less than 10 years old) contaminating ancient rodent burrows.

There was a persistent myth that seeds from Ancient Egyptian tombs were viable. The myth was reportedly started by scam artists selling "miracle seed" designed to capitalize on European Egyptomania of the 1800s. In 1897, the claims were tested by the British Museum's director of Egyptian antiquities, E. A. Wallis Budge. Budge provided genuine 3,000-year-old tomb grains of wheat to the director of Royal Botanic Gardens, Kew, William Thiselton-Dyer to plant under controlled conditions. The test resulted in none germinating.

Miscellaneous
The oldest carbon-14-dated plant tissue that has grown into a viable adult plant was a Silene stenophylla (narrow-leafed campion), an Arctic flower native to Siberia. The plants were not grown from seeds, which were not viable, but the placenta tissue of three fruits. Radiocarbon dating has confirmed an age of 31,800 ±300 years for the seeds. The Arctic ground squirrels (Urocitellus parryii) believed to have buried the seeds had damaged the mature seeds to prevent germination in the burrow, but three of the immature seeds contained viable placenta tissue, which was successfully grown in vitro. The plants  grew, flowered and created viable seeds of their own. The shape of the flowers differed from that of modern S. stenophylla with the petals being longer and more widely spaced than modern versions of the plant. Seeds produced by the regenerated plants germinated at a 100% success rate, compared with 90% for modern plants. Calculations of the γ radiation dose accumulated by the seeds since burial gave a reading of 0.07 kGy, the highest maximal dose recorded for seeds.

See also
Longevity
List of oldest trees
Orthodox seed
Seed bank

References

Seeds
Oldest things